The electoral district of Rowville is an electoral district of the Victorian Legislative Assembly in Australia. It was created in the redistribution of electoral boundaries in 2013, and came into effect at the 2014 state election.

It largely covers the area of the abolished district of Scoresby, covering eastern suburbs of Melbourne. It includes the suburbs of Rowville, Lysterfield, Ferntree Gully, Scoresby and Knoxfield.

The abolished seat of Scoresby was held by Liberal MP Kim Wells, who retained the new seat at the 2014 election.

Members

Election results

References

External links
 District profile from the Victorian Electoral Commission

Rowville, Electoral district of
2014 establishments in Australia
City of Knox
Electoral districts and divisions of Greater Melbourne